

See also 
 Georgia's at-large congressional district special elections, 1806
 United States House of Representatives elections, 1806 and 1807
 List of United States representatives from Georgia

1806
Georgia
United States House of Representatives